John M. Miller may refer to:

John Milton Miller (1882–1962),  American electrical engineer
John Miller (entomologist) (John Martin Miller, 1882–1952)
John M. Miller (artist) (born 1939), American painter
John M. Miller (1905 − 2008), pioneering American aviator

See also
John Miller (disambiguation)